The 4 × mile relay is an athletics track event in which teams comprise four runners who each complete one mile (1,609.344 metres) or slightly more than 4 laps on a standard 400 metre track.

The event is not often run as most legacy 440 yard tracks have been converted to 400 metres, thus making 4 × 1500 or 4 × 1600 metres easier to manage.  However, the Penn Relays still includes an annual "Championship of America" 4 × mile event for men. 

The World Athletics governing body does not recognise a World Record in this event.  The World Best for men in the event is a time of 15:49.08 by an Irish team of Eamonn Coghlan, Marcus O'Sullivan, Frank O'Mara  and Ray Flynn in 1985, representing an average of 3:57.3 per mile for each runner.

All-time top 15

Men
Updated May 2022.

Women
Updated May 2022.

References

Events in track and field
Track relay races